Adrian Păunescu (20 July 1943 – 5 November 2010) was a Romanian writer, publisher, cultural promoter, translator, and politician. A profoundly charismatic personality, a controversial and complex figure, the artist and the man are almost impossible to separate. On the one hand he stands accused of collaboration with the Communist regime, but on the other hand he was persecuted and ostracised by the regime when he started to confront its failures, and when his influence stated to be considered dangerous.

Though criticised for praising former Communist leader Nicolae Ceaușescu, Păunescu was called "Romania's most famous poet" in an Associated Press story, quoted by The New York Times.

Life
Born in Copăceni, Bălți County, in what is now the Republic of Moldova, Păunescu spent his childhood in Bârca, Dolj County. He started his secondary studies at the Frații Buzești National College in Craiova and then continued at Saint Sava National College in Bucharest.

Păunescu studied philology at the University of Bucharest and became a writer and journalist. He was an influential public figure for Romanian youth throughout the 1970s and early 1980s. Though he was criticised for writing flattering poems about Nicolae Ceauşescu, Păunescu remained popular in Romania, where he appeared on television several times a week.

As posthumously summarized by newspaper România Liberă, Păunescu "is still viewed as a hero by the man in the street" although "intellectuals continue to question his integrity and the literary value of his work".

Flacăra and Cenaclul Flacăra

A member of the Union of Communist Youth between 1966 and 1968, and, between 1968 and 1989, of the Romanian Communist Party, Păunescu gained control over a major weekly publication, Flacăra and became the producer and host of an immensely popular itinerant series of cultural events in the country, Cenaclul Flacăra, founded in 1973 and ended by the Communist authorities in 1985. The events included folk and pop music, poetry recitals, and Păunescu's personal and often rousing speeches. Through this cultural forum, Păunescu promoted Romanian poetry and music, instilling a nationalistic tone calling for pride in Romanian spiritual-artistic values and expression, seemingly as a counterpoint to the "puerile and pernicious" pop music (both Romanian and foreign) available on radio stations. Poets promoted included canonical names of Romanian literature: Mihai Eminescu, Lucian Blaga, Octavian Goga, George Bacovia, Nichita Stanescu, Ana Blandiana. Păunescu's own poems, recited at these events, have a social theme, about the life and difficulties of ordinary people. They remain very popular decades after, many Romanians being able to recite parts of them from memory. The performers were a mix of professional artists as well as talented amateurs vetted by Păunescu himself. Many of these ”novices” have become famous performers, household names - for example Nicu Alifantis, Adrian Ivaniţchi, Marcela Saftiuc, Mădălina Amon, Ștefan Hrușcă, Mircea Baniciu, Mircea Vintilă, Tatiana Stepa and many others. At the height of its popularity, the events were gathering tens of thousands of young people, filling stadiums.

Poetry 
As with the man, Adrian Păunescu's poetry is difficult to define or pigeonhole easily. On debut he writes in a modernist and mythological tone - reinterpreting old myths couched within abstract contemporary rhetoric. In this phase he also writes "pure poetry", similar to his illustrious contemporary Nichita Stănescu, although most people and literary critics mostly remember the later Păunescu poetry, the one moving to a Messianic tone, where his verses were sung and recited by thousands of young people in stadiums. Regarding the later, singer and song-writer Daniel Reynaud, who occasionally performs (Australia, USA) songs on verses of Păunescu translated in English, expressed the opinion that Against War (Antirăzboinica - Verses Adrian Păunescu, music Valeriu Sterian, translation Daniel Ioniță) is on par with any anti war poem or song Bob Dylan, or anyone, might have written.

According to literary critic Nicolae Manolescu, Adrian Păunescu is a both loved and loathed, authentic and false, capable of sublime poetry as well as mediocre slogans. He certainly irritates, be it by default or design: "I hate everything about his poet, apart from his poetry..." (Eugen Barbu). Păunescu is capable of large and swift movements of emotion and expression in his poetry, where loud posing can be followed by delicate doubt, and a pamphlet by a hymn. "A devilish body with an angel's soul". Literary historian and critic Alex Ștefănescu is of the opinion that if professionally anthologised, liberated from its weaker parts, Adrian Păunescu's poetry could be on par with the best of what Romanian poetry has to offer.

Political career
After 1989 Păunescu pursued a political career, aligning himself with socialism and then social-democratic political parties.

In 1996, he ran in that year's Romanian presidential election but received only 87,163 votes (0.69%). He was a senator from 1992 to 2008, representing Dolj County (1992–2004) and then Hunedoara County (2004–2008), initially representing the Socialist Labour Party (PSM), and later the Social Democratic Party of Romania (PSD). He received the most votes in his district at the 2008 election, but failed to win a seat after the votes were redistributed pursuant to the MMP system used.

Death and legacy

At aged 67, Păunescu was hospitalized on 26 October 2010 in the intensive care unit of the Floreasca Emergency Hospital in Bucharest, with problems of more vital organs caused by pulmonary edema. Păunescu had subsequent renal, liver and heart failure. He was declared dead at 7:15 AM, on 5 November 2010. Survived by his wife and three children, Păunescu was posthumously thanked by Romania's president Traian Băsescu, who in saluting him mentioned only his contributions to art.

In May 2012 a bronze bust of Păunescu, made by sculptors Ioan Deac-Bistrița and Dragoș Neagoe, was inaugurated at Grădina Icoanei, in central Bucharest.

Books
 Ultrasentimente (1965)
 Mieii primi (1966)
 Fântâna somnambulă (1968)
  Cărțile poștale ale morții (1970)
 Aventurile extraordinare ale lui Hap și Pap (1970)
 Viata de exceptii (1971)
 Sub semnul întrebării (1971)
 Istoria unei secunde (1971)
 Lumea ca lume (1973)
 Repetabila povară (1974)
 Pământul deocamdată (1976)
 Poezii de până azi (1978)
 Sub semnul întrebării (1979)
 Manifest pentru sănătatea pământului (1980)
 Iubiți-vă pe tunuri (1981)
 De la Bârca la Viena și înapoi (1981)
 Rezervația de zimbri (1982)
 Totuși iubirea (1983)
 Manifest pentru mileniul trei (1984)
 Manifest pentru mileniul trei (1986)
 Locuri comune (1986)
 Viața mea e un roman (1987)
 Într-adevăr (1988)
 Sunt un om liber (1989)
 Poezii cenzurate (1990)
 Romaniada (1993–1994)
 Bieți lampagii (1993–1994)
 Noaptea marii beții (1993–1994)
 Front fără învingători (1995)
 Infracțiunea de a fi (1996)
 Tragedia națională (1997)
 Deromânizarea României (1998)
 Cartea Cărților de Poezie (1999)
 Meserie mizarabilă, sufletul (2000)
 Măștile însîngerate (2001)
 Nemuritor la zidul morții (2001)
 Până la capăt (2002)
 Liber să sufăr (2003)
 Din doi în doi (2003)
 Eminamente (2003)
 Cartea Cărților de Poezie (2003)
 Logica avalanșei (2005)
 Antiprimăvara (2005)
 Ninsoarea de adio (2005)
 Un om pe niște scări (2006)
 De mamă și de foaie verde (2006)
 Copaci fără pădure (2006)
 Vagabonzi pe plaiul mioritic (2007)
 Rugă pentru părinți (2007)
 Încă viu (2008)
 Libertatea de unică folosință (2009)

Presence in English language anthologies 

 Testament - 400 Years of Romanian Poetry - 400 de ani de poezie românească - bilingual edition - Daniel Ioniță (editor and principal translator) with Daniel Reynaud, Adriana Paul & Eva Foster - Editura Minerva, 2019 - 
 Romanian Poetry from its Origins to the Present - bilingual edition English/Romanian - Daniel Ioniță (editor and principal translator) with Daniel Reynaud, Adriana Paul and Eva Foster - Australian-Romanian Academy Publishing - 2020 -  ; 
 Testament – Anthology of Romanian Verse – American Edition - monolingual English edition -  Daniel Ioniță (editor and translator), with Eva Foster, Daniel Reynaud and Rochelle Bews – Australian-Romanian Academy for Culture – 2017 – 
 The Bessarabia of my Soul / Basarabia Sufletului meu – a collection of poetry from the Republic of Moldova - bilingual English & Romanian -  Daniel Ioniță and Maria Tonu (editors), with Eva Foster, Daniel Reynaud and Rochelle Bews – MediaTon – Toronto -Canada – 2018 –

Electoral history

Presidential elections

References

External links

Official links
 Păunescu at AdrianPaunescu.ro (official website) 
 Păunescu at Blogspot (official blog) 

Writings
 Adrian Păunescu – Poetry 
 Two of Păunescu's Communist-era poems 
  at Cotidianul 

Music
 

Other
  evoked by Constantin Pîrvulescu 
 2013 Postage stamp issued by the Republic of Moldova

Social Democratic Party (Romania) politicians
People from Sîngerei District
Romanian communists
Romanian essayists
Romanian magazine editors
Romanian magazine founders
Romanian nationalists
Romanian newspaper editors
Romanian newspaper founders
Romanian male poets
Romanian people of Moldovan descent
Candidates for President of Romania
Members of the Senate of Romania
University of Bucharest alumni
Carol I National College alumni
1943 births
2010 deaths
20th-century Romanian poets
Male essayists
International Writing Program alumni
20th-century essayists
Saint Sava National College alumni
Deaths from multiple organ failure